Alsakharovite-Zn (IMA symbol: Ask-Zn) is an extremely rare alkaline strontium zinc titanium silicate mineral from the cyclosilicates class, with the chemical formula , from alkaline pegmatites. It belongs to the labuntsovite group.

The mineral crystallizes in the monoclinic system with space group Cm.

References

Cyclosilicates
Titanium minerals
Strontium minerals
Zinc minerals
Niobium minerals
Potassium minerals
Sodium minerals
Monoclinic minerals
Minerals in space group 8
Minerals described in 2003